Ruth Thorne-Thomsen (born 1943 New York City) is an American photographer who resides in Philadelphia. Important collections of her work are held by the Philadelphia Museum of Art, the Nelson-Atkins Museum, and the Art Institute of Chicago. She was married to the photographer Ray K. Metzker until his death in 2014.

Life and work

Between 1975 and 1993 Thorne-Thomsen produced an unorthodox body of photographs with a pinhole camera. She made portraits of friends and family members, staged toys and other props to create seemingly vast landscapes, and included her own cut-out photographs in some compositions, creating whimsical riffs on art history. Despite the modest appearance of these prints—most are smaller than 4x5 inches and are presented informally, with uneven edges and other markers of their simple production—they form a meditation on photography that has proven influential to other artists. Rooted on the one hand in 19th-century travel views by figures such as Maxime Du Camp and Francis Frith, which captivated Thorne-Thomsen, and on the other hand in amateur photography traditions from the Pictorialist movement onward, which she encountered firsthand in the work of her grandmother and mother, this resolutely un-authoritative group of pictures is a notable body of photography to emerge from the experimental decade of the 1970s.

Early life
Thorne-Thomsen was raised in Berkeley, California until age twelve, when her family moved to Lake Forest, Illinois. As a child she spent significant time visiting her grandmother at family ranches in Santa Barbara, where she developed her love for animals, gardening, and wide open spaces. She studied photography at Columbia College Chicago (1971–1973) and the School of the Art Institute of Chicago (1974–1976) following earlier programs in dance and painting at Columbia College, Missouri (1961–1963) and Southern Illinois University, Carbondale (1966–1970). Initially intending to become a dancer, she performed with the Sybil Shearer Dance Company in Northbrook, Illinois from 1964–1965. A 1971 trip to the Brooks Range in Alaska sparked her interest in photography.

Career
Early in her studies she encountered pinhole photography and began exploring its potential through multiple overlapping series, notably Expeditions (1976–1982), Prima Materia (1984–1987), Views from the Shoreline (1986–1987) and Songs of the Sea (1991–1993). She made many of these pictures in Chicago and Santa Barbara, as well as Door County, Wisconsin, where she and Metzker would visit her parents on their way to Castle Valley, Utah. They owned a home in Castle Valley from 1999 until 2016, and both photographed extensively in the area. Thorne-Thomsen also explored other aspects of photography, notably in her series Messengers (1989–1991), large studies of sculptures and art illustrations that incorporate movement of the camera.

Within This Garden: Photographs by Ruth Thorne-Thomsen accompanied her exhibition of the same title, which was published by The Museum of Contemporary Photography in association with Aperture, with an essay by Denise Miller-Clark and an original poem by Poet Laureate Mark Strand.

Personal life 
Thorne-Thomsen is a descendant of the American statesman Elbridge Gerry Spaulding, so-called “Father of the Greenback,” as well as the Norwegian actress and minister, Fredrikke Nielsen. She lives in a home that she and her husband, Ray K. Metzker, built together in Philadelphia, where she maintains an extensive garden.

Collections
 Art Institute of Chicago
 Bibliothèque Nationale, Paris
 Center for Creative Photography, Tucson
 Centre Georges Pompidou, Paris
 Cleveland Museum of Art
 Denver Art Museum
 Honolulu Museum of Art
International Center of Photography
 J. Paul Getty Museum 
 Los Angeles County Museum of Art
 The Metropolitan Museum of Art
 Milwaukee Museum of Art
 Museum of Contemporary Art Chicago
Museum of Contemporary Photography
 Museum of Fine Arts, Houston
 Nelson-Atkins Museum of Art
 Philadelphia Museum of Art
 Rockford Art Museum Rockford, IL
 San Francisco Museum of Modern Art
The Walker Art Center, Minneapolis
 Whitney Museum of American Art

Exhibitions

2000
Le Siecle du Corps- Photographs of the Ancient World, Le Musee de L'Elysée Lausanne, Switzerland
Orphans, Schmidt Dean Gallery Philadelphia, PA
1999
The Cultured Tourist, Leslie Tonkonow Gallery New York, NY
1998
A Retrospective Journey – Photographs by Ruth Thorne-Thomsen, Jackson Fine Art Atlanta, GA
Egypt of the Mind, Denver Art Museum Denver, CO
Years Ending in Nine, Museum of Fine Arts Houston, TX
1997
Eye of the Beholder: Photographs from the Avon Collection, International Center of Photography New York, NY
Fifty Years of Contemporary American Photography: 1947–1997, Venlo, Netherlands
ARCO-Art Expo Madrid, Spain
1996
Kobe Aid Fund, World Photo Art Exhibition and Auction Tokyo, Japan
Art in Chicago, 1945–1995, Museum of Contemporary Art Chicago, IL
Portfolio – Ruth Thorne-Thomsen, Vigovisions, V Fotobienal Vigo, Spain
1994
Explorations, Past Rays Photo Gallery & Gallery Nayuta Yokohama, Japan
Within This Garden: Photographs by Ruth Thorne-Thomsen, California Museum of Photography Riverside, CA
1993
Within This Garden: Photographs by Ruth Thorne-Thomsen, Museum of Contemporary Photography Chicago, IL
Cleveland Museum of Art Cleveland, OH

References 

 https://books.google.com/books?id=1ulTAAAAMAAJ
 https://books.google.com/books?isbn=1317371836

American women photographers
1943 births
Living people
Photographers from New York City
Artists from Philadelphia
21st-century American women